Impostor Factory is a 2021 adventure video game developed and published by Freebird Games. Like A Bird Story, the game was a follow-up and prequel of To the Moon and Finding Paradise, the story revolves around new protagonist Quincy Reynard, who ends up in a murder case inside the mansion but suddenly finds himself experiencing double murders and mysterious time loops. The game was initially planned to be released at the end of 2020, and was released in September 30, 2021 for Windows to positive reviews.

Gameplay 
Impostor Factory is similar to that of the first game in the series, To the Moon, which was built on the RPG Maker XP engine. Like the previous game, it functions like a typical RPG, but lacks many RPG elements. However, unlike its predecessors, Impostor Factory does feature an inventory and party system, but these features are used only for jokes, and have no impact on the gameplay. Players simply navigate Quincy through story events as he tries to understand the events unraveling around him.

Plot
On a rainy afternoon, Quincy Reynard arrives at what appears to be a decrepit mansion for a party. The massive estate is owned by Dr. Yu and Dr. Haynes, who run the illustrious Yu-Haynes Foundation in an underground lab hidden deep beneath the mansion. Quincy gets acquainted with the other party guests, including Lynri, a mysterious young woman with the ability to seemingly be in two places at once. As Quincy navigates the party, he finds that the sink in the bathroom can apparently rewind time for him. Eventually, Quincy accidentally stumbles upon the corpses of a recently murdered Dr. Yu and Dr. Haynes. Accused of being the murderer for his strange behavior, Quincy runs away to rewind time in the bathroom, but is eventually informed by Lynri that the murders are not real, the world he inhabits is nothing but a simulation, and that Lynri had created him.

Overwhelmed with an existential crisis, Quincy is sent out by Lynri to view another simulation to properly explain the situation, which turns out to be Lynri's memories. As a young child, Lynri was prone to sudden blackouts and was eventually diagnosed with a rare condition that could become malignant with little warning. Isolated from her peers by the knowledge of her condition, Lynri devoted herself to studying neuroscience, specifically researching a method on how to encode human memories into computers. In college, Lynri meets Quincy for the first time. The Quincy observing the memories is shocked, as he has no recollection of any of the events he's seeing, but continues to watch the story unfold. As time passes, Lynri and Quincy grow close. Despite knowing what Lynri's condition would mean for both of them, Quincy and Lynri fall in love and start dating. On graduation day, Lynri is approached by representatives from the Yu-Haynes Foundation over a research paper she had published. Offered an illustrious and lucrative job, Lynri and Quincy move in together. Lynri immediately begins to work with the Foundation on developing technology that would interface with directly with human memories, while Quincy takes on domestic life roles.

Over time, Lynri's job begins demanding more and more of her time, causing friction between her and Quincy. The Foundation offers Lynri to live within the mansion's residential complex to remove the commute, as some other employees do, but she is uncertain. However, on the day where Lynri is to present the Foundation's progress to a group of investors, she arrives late, and finds that the demonstration had already proceeded but ended up killing one of her colleagues. While the Foundation and the investors heatedly debate about the use of memory-interfacing technology that just kills its users, Lynri, knowing that she was supposed to be the one handling the demonstration that day, immediately quits her job and returns home. Overwhelmed with the realization that she could have died right then, independent of her health, Lynri decides to travels the world with Quincy, finally fulfilling a long time goal of theirs. Upon returning home, Lynri learns that she is pregnant. Though Lynri is concerned about how her hereditary condition could affect her and the pregnancy, she and Quincy ultimately decide to go through with it. However, Lynri's condition suddenly becomes acute late into her pregnancy. She is forced to either give birth prematurely to have a time-sensitive life-saving operation, or postpone the operation to allow her child a healthy birth and possibly render the operation ineffective. Lynri chooses the former.

Tobias Reynard is born to Lynri and Quincy prematurely. Consistently wheelchair-bound and on oxygen support, Tobias is raised with all the love his family could give him, but ultimately dies of health complications as a young child. Heartbroken and guilt-ridden, Lynri and Quincy start drifting apart. Eventually, Lynri leaves Quincy without a word to return to work and live at the Yu-Haynes Foundation. She devotes all of her time to developing the memory interfacing technology, and eventually decides to run another simulation test. She samples her own memories to create an early version of Quincy that would serve as a test character, thus explaining the Quincy the player is controlling.

Finished with observing Lynri's life story, Quincy returns to the mansion where present-day Lynri explains that the murders he had observed earlier were flaws in the simulation she was trying to correct. Quincy agrees to help her out and Lynri briefly exits the simulation. When Lynri returns and Quincy finishes doing all the tasks Lynri had set for him, they are both confronted by Watt's AI assistant Faye from Finding Paradise. Lynri realizes that she, too, is not real, and that even her world is the result of multiple simulations of her memory simulating more tests from the memory interfacing machine. Faye tells them that there are too many levels in the current simulation and that she'll have to delete their world soon. However, before doing so, Faye tells the duo that this simulation was allowed to run because it was very close to the real story of Lynri. Faye explains that in reality, Lynri chose to delay her operation to have a healthy baby. This baby was Neil Watts from the previous games, as Quincy decided that their newborn should inherit Lynri's family name instead of his. Lynri would only live for a few more years, so towards the end of her life, she returned to the Yu-Haynes Foundation to use their memory-interfacing machine to preserve her memory for a grown-up Neil. Neil, later diagnosed with the same condition as his mother, would eventually find his way into Sigmund Corp., which had licensed the imperfect memory interface machine to grant wishes to the dying, so that Neil could continue working on a version of the machine that would unlock his mother's memories. Neil was eventually successful, and that machine is the one currently running the simulation the current Lynri and Quincy are in.

At this point, Faye deletes the world they're inhabiting, but offers Quincy and Lynri an opportunity to live a perfect timeline. After some convincing, Lynri agrees to go with Quincy. The two then proceed to live a life where Lynri's condition is permanently gone and she gets to have a happy marriage with Quincy, watching Neil grow up all the way, get married, and have a child of his own. In their old age, when their time is almost over, Lynri and Quincy express their gratitude towards Faye. Faye assures them that their son is still watching over them and briefly celebrates their good life. The simulation then permanently ends.

In the post-credit scene, the real Dr. Neil Watts talks to Faye about what constitutes to a perfect world, and whether or not the simulation just now was perfect by any standard. He is eventually interrupted by his Sigmund colleagues at his door, inviting him for a casual hangout. Neil heads out with them.

Development and release 
Impostor Factory was first announced on March 2019, though it was not yet confirmed whether the game would be a part of the Sigmund Corp. series. The official trailer premiered on August 2020. It prominently features an unnamed lady in a red dress, presumably the same one featured in the promotional posters.

In November 2020, Kan Gao announced that the release date was pushed back to spring 2021. It was further delayed per a July 2021 announcement on the game's Steam news page, stating that the game was set to release in September. The game was released on September 30th, 2021. An update on the game's Steam page pushed the release back to September. The game released on September 30, 2021.

Laura Shigihara, whose vocals were featured in the previous major installments, is noticeably uncredited due to her voice wasn't suited for the game's darker elements.

Reception

Impostor Factory has received generally positive reception, with a score of 80 out of 100 on review aggregator Metacritic, averaged from 13 critic reviews, indicating "generally favorable" reviews.

Damaso Scibetta of IGN Italia, gave a positive review, saying: "Gao's writing is always impeccable and is capable of never falling into the banal, even when it touches themes already abused in the medium and in narration in general."

Bob Richardson of RPG Fan, also gave a positive review, saying: "It’s akin to going into an art gallery and scoring each painting or sculpture, and while that seems like I’m laying the praise on a bit thick, I genuinely feel this way."

References

2021 video games
Adventure games
Freebird Games games
Indie video games
Role-playing video games
RPG Maker games
Single-player video games
Video games about time loops
Video games developed in Canada